Lucerne District (District 2) is a municipal district in the city of Gatineau, Quebec. It is represented on Gatineau City Council by Gilles Chagnon.

The district is located in the Aylmer sector of the city. It is one of five districts in the sector. The district includes the neighbourhoods of La Seigneurie, Jardins Lavigne and some of Aylmer's northern suburban developments.

Councillors
Alain Labonté (2001-2005)
André Laframboise (2005-2013)
Mike Duggan (2013-2017)
Gilles Chagnon (2017–present)

Election results

2021

2017

2013

2009

2005

2001

References

Districts of Gatineau